Gustavo Vintecinco (born 2 August 1995) is a Brazilian footballer who currently plays as a forward.

Career statistics

Club

Notes

References

1995 births
Living people
Brazilian footballers
Brazilian expatriate footballers
Association football forwards
Esporte Clube Santo André players
Esporte Clube XV de Novembro (Jaú) players
União Agrícola Barbarense Futebol Clube players
Mogi Mirim Esporte Clube players
Sertãozinho Futebol Clube players
Clube Atlético Bragantino players
Ansan Greeners FC players
Busan IPark players
K League 2 players
Brazilian expatriate sportspeople in South Korea
Expatriate footballers in South Korea
People from Santo André, São Paulo
Footballers from São Paulo (state)